Neoconocephalus palustris, the marsh conehead, is a species of conehead in the family Tettigoniidae. It is found in North America.

References

palustris
Articles created by Qbugbot
Insects described in 1893